Albena Petrova Denkova (born 3 December 1974) is a Bulgarian ice dancer. With partner and fiance Maxim Staviski, she is a two-time (2006–2007) World champion, a two-time (2003–2004) European silver medalist, and the 2006 Grand Prix Final champion. Denkova and Staviski are the first Bulgarians to medal at the World Figure Skating Championships.

Career  
began her athletic career as a gymnast at the age of four, and switched to figure skating at about 8 or 9. She took up ice dancing when she was 12. Her first ice dance partner was Hristo Nikolov but they split up due to different ambitions. In 1996, Denkova had a successful tryout with Maxim Staviski in Moscow and he moved to Sofia to compete with her for Bulgaria. They soon became a couple off-ice, as well. In September 2000, Denkova / Staviski began dividing their time between Sofia and Odintsovo, near Moscow, Russia where they worked with coach Alexei Gorshkov and choreographer Sergei Petukhov.

Denkova / Staviski withdrew from the 2000 European Championships after Staviski fell ill with pneumonia. During the last practice session before the free dance at the 2000 World Championships, Peter Tchernyshev's blade slashed Denkova's leg above her boot, severing two tendons and a muscle and leaving her unable to walk for three months. She eventually returned to training but suffered swelling in her leg. After she asked the U.S. Figure Skating Association if Tchernyshev had insurance to help cover her medical expenses, the organizers withdrew Denkova / Staviski's invitation to 2000 Skate America. Both Denkova and Staviski fell ill with the flu before the 2001 European Championships and she suffered more swelling but they competed at the event and finished 8th, their best result to that date.

Denkova / Staviski took the silver medal at the 2003 European Championships, becoming the first skaters to medal for Bulgaria at an ISU Championships. They then became the first Bulgarians to medal at Worlds, winning bronze at the 2003 World Championships. The following season, they repeated as silver medalists at Europeans and went on to become World silver medalists.

In 2004–05, Denkova / Staviski withdrew from Europeans and finished 5th at Worlds. At the end of the season, they parted ways with Gorshkov and moved to Newark, Delaware, U.S., to train with Natalia Linichuk and Gennadi Karponosov. They finished 5th at their third Olympics. At the 2006 World Championships, they became the first Bulgarians to win World gold in figure skating. 

In October 2006, it was announced that Denkova had been elected President of the Bulgarian Skating Federation.

In 2006–07, Denkova / Staviski won gold at the Grand Prix Final, bronze at Europeans, and gold once again at Worlds. On 10 April 2007, they were awarded the Stara Planina Order, Bulgaria's highest award. On 19 April 2007, they received a star on Bulgaria's Walk of Fame.

On 5 August 2007, Maxim Staviski caused a car accident while driving drunk in Bulgaria that left 24-year-old Petar Petrov dead and Petrov's fiancee, 18-year-old Manuela Gorsova, in a coma. In October 2007, he announced his retirement from competitive skating and Denkova was thus forced to retire, as well. They continued to skate in shows around the world and have also done choreography, working with Brian Joubert a few times. Having said in 2004 that Bulgaria did not have many skating facilities and coaches, Denkova opened a skating school with Staviski in Sofia called SC Ice Dance Denkova/Staviski. They have also participated in the Russian television show Ice Age.

Personal life 
Denkova and Staviski are engaged to marry. Their son Daniel was born on 30 January 2011. Denkova has a younger half-sister, Ina Demireva, who also competed in ice dancing. Her brother-in-law is solo skater Andrei Lutai. Denkova holds a degree in economics from Sofia University.

Programs

Competitive highlights

With Staviski

With Nikolov

References

External links 

Denkova / Staviski official web site

Navigation 

1974 births
Living people
Bulgarian female ice dancers
Olympic figure skaters of Bulgaria
Figure skaters at the 1998 Winter Olympics
Figure skaters at the 2002 Winter Olympics
Figure skaters at the 2006 Winter Olympics
World Figure Skating Championships medalists
European Figure Skating Championships medalists
Season-end world number one figure skaters
Figure skaters from Sofia